Val Fuentes (born November 25, 1947 in Chicago, Illinois) is the original and current drummer for the progressive folk/rock band It's a Beautiful Day. He has also played with Fat Chance, New Riders of the Purple Sage, Shadowfax, Lina Valentino, Linda Imperial, The Pure Pleasure Band, and The Moments. 
Fuentes lives in California and plays shows with David LaFlamme and It's a Beautiful Day, as well as several other local Sonoma County bands such as The Zins, a rock/funk group.

His son Carlo Fuentes was born on November 25, 1985, and also plays drums and piano, and sings. He has played in numerous local bands.

References

1947 births
Living people
New Riders of the Purple Sage members
20th-century American drummers
American male drummers
20th-century American male musicians